Volatility risk is the risk of a change of price of a portfolio as a result of changes in the volatility of a risk factor. It usually applies to portfolios of derivatives instruments, where the volatility of its underlying is a major influencer of prices.

Sensitivity to volatility

A measure for the sensitivity of a price of a portfolio (or asset) to changes in volatility is vega, the rate of change of the value of the portfolio with respect to the volatility of the underlying asset.

Risk management
This kind of risk can be managed using appropriate financial instruments whose price depends on the volatility of a given financial asset (a stock, a commodity, an interest rate, etc.). Examples are Futures contracts such as VIX for equities, or caps, floors and swaptions for interest rates.

Risk management is the configuration and identification of analyzing, and or acceptance during investment decision-making. In essence this occurs whenever an investor or portfolio manager evaluates potential losses within an investment. Under certain investment objectives, appropriate solutions (or no solution) will occur to assess the investors goals and standards.

Improper risk management can and or will negatively affect companies as well as their individuals. For example, the recession that began in 2008 was largely caused by the loose credit risk management of financial firms.

See also
Derivative
Implied volatility
Market risk
Risk management
Standard deviation
Value at risk method
Volatility risk premium

References

Financial risk
Market risk